Ceylon Communist Party (Maoist) is a political party in Sri Lanka. The party surged in 1964 following a split in the Ceylon Communist Party. Initially the party just called itself 'Ceylon Communist Party' as well, and was distinguished from the main CCP in Sri Lanka by denominations like 'Ceylon Communist Party (Peking Wing)', etc. In the end of the 1960s the party was one of the major leftist parties in the country. Initially Party was led by Premalal Kumarasiri and N. Shanmugathasan.

History

1960s

Background 

In June 1963, K.A. Subramaniam and D.B. Alwis  have signed an agreement with All-China Youth Federation on behalf of the Ceylon Federation of Communist and Progressive Youth Leagues for cooperation between the two organizations. They met China's vice premier and foreign minister Chen Yi during this trip to the People's Republic of China in 1963.

Initial Organising Committee 
The Organising Committee as on November 17, 1963 consisting of Premalal Kumarasiri, N. Sanmugathasan, D. N. Nadunge, D. K. D. Jinendrapala, Higgoda Dharmasena, K. Manickavasagar, N. L. Perera, K. Wimalapala, K. Kulaveerasingham, W. S. de Siriwardene, A. D. Charleshamy, Watson Fernando, W. A. Dharmadasa, S. M. Wickremasinghe, A. Jayasuriya, D. A. Gunasekera, Cyril Kulatunge, Victor Silva, K.A. Subramaniam, Susima, K. V. Krishnakutty, S. Janapriya, Kanti Abeyasekere, E. T. Moorthy, Dharmadasa Jayakoddy, H. G. A. de Silva, S. M. P. de Silva, H. M. P. Mohideen, D. M. J. Abeyagunewardene, O. A. Ramiah, D. B. Alwis, C. S. Manohar, S. Sivadasan, Samarasiri de Silva and P. Wijayatileke.

Founding 
CPP founded in 1964. Premalal Kumarasiri received the Zhou Enlai, first Premier of the People's Republic of China, on behalf of the Ceylon Communist Party (Maoist) when Zhou visited Sri Lanka in 1964.

Early years and first splits 

In 1964, Rohana Wijeweera became a functionary of the Ceylon Communist Party (Maoist). Soon he was at odds with party leaders and impatient with their lack of revolutionary purpose and formed his own movement on 14 May 1965 after a discussion with like minded youth. It became known as the Janatha Vimukthi Peramuna or JVP. Subsequently, the “Peradiga Sulanga” (Broad Wind) team led by Gamini Yapa also left the Party.

In 1965, W. A. Dharmadasa returned to the Ceylon Communist Party. He was actively working for Ceylon Communist Party (Maoist) in Tamil speaking areas also.

Representation in the Parliament 
From 1965 to 1970 S. D. Bandaranayake was representing Ceylon Communist Party (Maoist) views in the parliament. During the struggles in the North against caste oppression and untouchability, he spoke in support of the struggles in parliament as well as visited the north with N. Shanmugathasan and K. A. Subramaniam to personally express solidarity with the struggling masses.

In 1966 S. D. Bandaranayake questioned in the parliament regarding the mass uprising procession held from Chunnakam on 21 October 1966 to protest the caste oppression. Ceylon Communist Party (Maoist) took the decision to carry forward the struggle and to conduct the procession in defiance of the ban by the police, this gave revolutionary enthusiasm to all the fronts of the Party. The blow struck on the procession opposing casteism in Chunnakam on 21 October 1966, many cadres were brutally assaulted by the police and received bleeding injuries.

S. D. Bandaranayake, D. K. D. Jinendrapala, and Watson Fernando were arrested on 1 May 1969 in Colombo when the UNP Government banned the May Day rally. The Ceylon Communist Party (Maoist) key leaders were brutally assaulted and arrested by the Police in Jaffna. Among them K.A. Subramaniam bed ridden for months at the residence of N. Sanmugathasan for treatment. S. D. Bandaranayake questioned in the parliament regarding these atrocities against the mass rally held in Jaffna on 1 May 1969 to protest the ban.

1970s 

In 1972, some cadres criticized the party leader N. Shanmugathasan's opposition to the United Front government, arguing that UF was a 'progressive force'. Whilst the party leader N. Shanmugathasan was abroad in Albania in April 1972, D. N. Nadunge, Watson Fernando, E. T. Moorthy, D. A. Gunasekara and V.A. Kandasamy tried to seize control over the party.  This faction regrouped and at a meeting on November 12, 1972 it took the name Communist Party of Sri Lanka (Marxist-Leninist). They sought to bring the Maoist movement closer to the UF orbit, but this faction remained a minor group compared to N. Shanmugathasan's Ceylon Communist Party (Maoist) which had the strong support from Samal De Silva, Kanti Abeyasekere and K.A. Subramaniam.

Following the death of Mao Zedong and the take-over in China by Deng Xiaoping, the party strongly denounced the new line of the Chinese leadership. In 1978, Party, led by N. Sanmugathasan, issued a public statement in defiance of the decision of the Central Committee not to accept the decision of the Tamil's self-determination and reject the Three Worlds Theory. This decision led to a split with Tamil self-determination and TWT defenders, and many, including Samal De Silva, K.A. Subramaniam, S. K. Senthivel, S. D. Bandaranayake left the party and formed a new political party called the Communist Party of Sri Lanka (Left).

1980s onwards 
The party regrouped internationally amongst those who reaffirmed Maoism, and was one of the signatories of the founding declaration of the Revolutionary Internationalist Movement.

In 1991 a conference was held which reconstructed it as 'Ceylon Communist Party (Maoist)'. N. Sanmugathasan led the party until his death in 1993.

International affiliations
The party already maintained strong connections with China in the era of Mao Zedong. Following the beginning of the Naxalite insurgency, CCP supported the CPI (M-L) by working as the liaison point between the Naxalites and China. Ajith Rupasinghe Surendra was affiliated the pro-Democracy factions in the Nepalese Civil War. Party was a member of the former Revolutionary Internationalist Movement.

See also 
 Communist Party of Sri Lanka
 Communist Party of India (Maoist)
 Left Liberation Front
 People's Liberation Army, Nepal

References 

Maoist parties
Communist parties in Sri Lanka
Political parties established in 1964
1964 establishments in Ceylon
Revolutionary Internationalist Movement
Anti-revisionist organizations
Maoism in Asia